The 1983–84 season was the 62nd season of competitive association football and 55th season in the Football League played by York City Football Club, a professional football club based in York, North Yorkshire, England. They finished in first position in the 24-team 1983–84 Football League Fourth Division, in doing so becoming the first Football League club to reach and surpass a hundred points in a season. By winning the Fourth Division championship, York earned the first major honour in the club's history.

They entered the 1983–84 FA Cup in the first round, beating Macclesfield Town in a replay before losing at home to Rochdale in the second round. They were knocked out in the first round of both the 1983–84 Football League Cup and 1983–84 Associate Members' Cup, being beaten by Grimsby Town and Hull City respectively.

18 players made at least one appearance in nationally organised first-team competition, and there were 11 different goalscorers. Defender John MacPhail, midfielder Gary Ford and striker John Byrne played in all 52 first-team matches over the season. Byrne finished as leading goalscorer with 28 goals, of which 27 came in league competition and one came in the FA Cup. The winner of the Clubman of the Year award was MacPhail.

Match details

Football League Fourth Division

League table (part)

FA Cup

League Cup

Associate Members' Cup

Appearances and goals
Numbers in parentheses denote appearances as substitute.
Players with names struck through and marked  left the club during the playing season.
Players with names in italics and marked * were on loan from another club for the whole of their season with York.
Key to positions: GK – Goalkeeper; DF – Defender; MF – Midfielder; FW – Forward

See also
List of York City F.C. seasons

References
General

Source for match dates, league positions and results: 
Source for appearances, goalscorers and attendances: 
Source for Bristol City own goal from match played 3 March 1984: 
Source for player details: 

Specific

1983–84
English football clubs 1983–84 season
Foot